The Very Best of Neil Sedaka is a 2001 compilation album issued by RCA Records as part of their commemorative "100th Anniversary" series of albums celebrating their biggest stars. The album features some of Sedaka's best-known hits during his days with RCA, recorded from 1958 to 1963.

Track listing
 "The Diary" (1958)
 "I Go Ape" (1959)
 "Oh! Carol" (1959)
 "Stairway to Heaven" (1960)
 "You Mean Everything to Me" (1960)
 "Run Samson Run" (1960)
 "Calendar Girl" (1961)
 "Little Devil" (1961)
 "Happy Birthday Sweet Sixteen" (1961)
 "Breaking Up Is Hard to Do" (1962)
 "Next Door to an Angel" (1962)
 "Alice in Wonderland" (1963)
 "Let's Go Steady Again" (1963)
 "Bad Girl" (1963)

References

2001 compilation albums
Neil Sedaka compilation albums
RCA Records compilation albums